The 2002 United States Senate election in Georgia took place on November 5, 2002. Incumbent Democratic U.S. Senator Max Cleland ran for re-election to a second term, but was defeated by Republican Saxby Chambliss by nearly a 7 point margin.

This was the last midterm senate election in which an incumbent of the out-of-presidency party lost reelection until 2018. Chambliss became the first Republican ever to hold Georgia's class 2 Senate seat.

Democratic Primary 
Max Cleland, the incumbent U.S. Senator, won renomination unopposed.

Republican Primary 

Three candidates ran in the primary:

 Saxby Chambliss, U.S. Representative
 Bob Irvin, State Representative
 Robert Brown, a rancher from Yatesville

Chambliss won easily, carrying nearly every county.

Campaign 
Chambliss's campaign used the refrain of national defense and security, but drew criticism for television ads that paired images of Cleland and Osama bin Laden and Saddam Hussein, and for questioning the commitment to homeland security of his opponent, a triple amputee and decorated Vietnam veteran. Republican Senator and fellow Vietnam veteran John McCain of Arizona said of one ad, "It's worse than disgraceful, it's reprehensible."  McCain, along with Republican Senator and fellow Vietnam veteran Chuck Hagel of Nebraska, made significant complaints to the Republican National Committee until the ads were taken down. Political strategist Rick Wilson received criticism from numerous journalists for his role in the ad, including from Glenn Greenwald, Charlie Pierce, and the Center for Public Integrity.

Debates
Complete video of debate, October 27, 2002

General election

Predictions

Results

See also 
 2002 United States Senate elections

References 

Georgia
2002
2002 Georgia (U.S. state) elections